Luciano César Cingolani (born 6 April 2001) is an Argentine professional footballer who plays as a winger for Newell's Old Boys.

Club career
Cingolani joined the academy of Newell's Old Boys at the age of twelve. In November 2017, Cingolani was linked with a move to English club Manchester United. In August 2019, Cingolani signed his first professional contract; penning terms until June 2022. His senior debut would arrive sixteen months later, as the forward featured for the final fifteen minutes of a Copa de la Liga Profesional win over Central Córdoba on 28 December 2020; having replaced Jerónimo Cacciabue.

International career
In July 2019, Cingolani received a call-up from the Argentina U18s.

Career statistics
.

Notes

References

External links

2001 births
Living people
Footballers from Rosario, Santa Fe
Argentine people of Italian descent
Argentine footballers
Argentina youth international footballers
Association football wingers
Argentine Primera División players
Newell's Old Boys footballers